The Beverley Road station is a local station on the BMT Brighton Line of the New York City Subway. It is located over a private right-of-way at Beverly Road between Marlborough Road/East 15th Street and East 16th Street in the neighborhood of Flatbush, Brooklyn. The station is served by the Q train at all times.

History

The original station at this location was opened around 1900 as a two-track street-level side platform station running south from a grade crossing at Beverley Road. The station was established to serve the then-new upscale planned community of Prospect Park South. The current station house and below-grade platforms were completed at the end of 1907, and have been on the National Register of Historic Places since 2004.

Station layout

This open-cut station has four tracks and two side platforms, typical for a New York City Subway local station.

This station is spelled with three "e"s, unlike its Nostrand Avenue IRT counterpart, which is spelled with two, reflecting the original spelling of the street's name. The 1907 station-house was the focus of an early 1990s in-house renovation. Sitting on the open-cut portion of the Brighton Line, another gentle curve to the right is at the far north end along with clearly visible platform extensions, allowing passengers to watch trains between Church Avenue and Cortelyou Road.

Exit
The station's sole entrance is through a station house at Beverly Road between Marlborough Road and East 16th Streets. The station-house features artwork called Garden Stops by Patsy Norvell, which has etched images of leaves on the glass windows inside fare control facing the south. The artwork can be seen from both inside the mezzanine and while standing on either platform to the south; this artwork is also visible at the neighboring Cortelyou Road station. Colors at this station are green and beige.

References

External links 

 
 Station Reporter — Q train
 The Subway Nut — Beverley Road Pictures 
 MTA's Arts For Transit — Beverley Road (BMT Brighton Line)
 Beverley Road entrance from Google Maps Street View
 Platforms from Google Maps Street View

BMT Brighton Line stations
Railway and subway stations on the National Register of Historic Places in New York City
New York City Subway stations in Brooklyn
Railway stations in the United States opened in 1907
1900 establishments in New York City
Flatbush, Brooklyn
National Register of Historic Places in Brooklyn
1907 establishments in New York City